was a feudal domain under the Tokugawa shogunate of Edo period Japan, located in Settsu Province in what is now the southeastern portion of modern-day Hyōgo Prefecture.  It had its administrative headquarters at Sanda jin'ya (later styled "Sanda Castle"), located in what is now the city of Sanda, Hyōgo Prefecture.   It was controlled by the tozama daimyō Kuki clan throughout most of its history.

History
Araki Murashige conquered Settsu Province for Oda Nobunaga and rebuilt an ancient fortification which had been erected by the Akamatsu clan as Sanda Castle in 1575. After he was killed in his revolt against Nobunaga in 1582, the castle was assigned to Nobunaga's general, Yamazaki Katase as part of a 23,000 koku domain. His son, Yamazaki Iemori, although serving in the losing Western Army in the Battle of Sekigahara, was transferred to Wakasa Domain in Inaba Province with an increase to 30,000 koku by Tokugawa Ieyasu. He was replaced by Arima Noriyori, a general in the Eastern Army. On his death, the domain was merged by his heir Arima Toyōji, with Fukuchiyama Domain in Tamba Province and Sanda Castle was destroyed. Due to his exploits in the Battle of Osaka in 1620, he was promoted to 200,000 koku and transferred to Kurume Domain in Chikugo Province. In 1626, Matsudaira Shigenao, formerly of Kaminoyama Domain in Dewa Province was assigned a kokudaka of 30,000 koku, and Sanda Domain was reestablished. He was later transferred to Bungo Province. In 1633, Kuki Hisakata was transferred to Sanda from Toba Domain in Shima Province. The Kuki clan had a fleet of armored ships and controlled maritime traffic around Ise Bay, fighting on both sides during the Battle of Sekigahara, with Kuki Yoshitaka siding with the western forces loyal to Toyotomi Hideyori, and his son Kuki Moritaka, joining the eastern armies of Tokugawa Ieyasu. With the establishment of the Tokugawa shogunate, Kuki Moritaka was confirmed as daimyō of Toba, initially with a kokudaka of 35,000 koku, growing to 55,000 koku under his son Kuki Hisataka. However, on Kuki Hisakata's death, there was a succession dispute, and the shogunate punished both parties by reassigning Kuki Hirakata to inland Sanda with 36,000 koku and his brother Kuki Takase to inland Ayabe Domain in Tanba Province with 20,000 koku.

The Kuki ruled Sanda for 240 years until the Meiji restoration. However, due to their large number of retainers and reduced circumstances, the clan was always in financial difficulties.  In 1742, the 7th daimyō , Kuki Takayoshi, opened a domain school, Kokkokan. In 1780, when the 8th daimyō, Kuki Takamura, raised taxes, a peasant uprising broke out, and several merchant houses in the castle town were destroyed. Kuki Takakuni, the 10th daimyō reformed the han school 'Kokkoukan' as 'Zoshikan.'  He also showed an interest in Western studies, and opened the modernization of the Sanda Domain. He was also raised in status to that of a "castle-holding daimyō", although no castle was actually built. The 13th (and final) daimyō, Kuki Takayoshi, reformed domain administration and reformed the domain army along Western lines. In 1867, he led his modernized forces on the imperial side in the Battle of Toba-Fushimi to overthrow the shogunate. Upon learning that would be developed as a foreign trade port, he helped establish 'Shima San Shokai,' Kobe's first import trading company. This was successful, and he embarked on the real estate and financial businesses, and had a great influence on the urban development of Kobe. In 1871, Sanda Domain became "Sanda Prefecture" with the abolition of the han system. Later it was incorporated into Hyōgo Prefecture. In 1884, Kuki Takayoshi became a viscount (shishaku) in the new kazoku peerage.

Sanda jin'ya was located on the site of the current Arima High School, and the daimyō residence was located on the site of the current Mita Elementary School. At present, all that remains is a portion of a water moat.

Holdings at the end of the Edo period
As with most domains in the han system, Sanda Domain consisted of several discontinuous territories calculated to provide the assigned kokudaka, based on periodic cadastral surveys and projected agricultural yields. 

Settsu Province 
53 villages in Arima District 
Tanba Province
10 villages in Hikami District

List of daimyō 

{| class=wikitable
! #||Name || Tenure || Courtesy title || Court Rank || kokudaka 
|-
|colspan=6|  Yamazaki clan, 1591-1601 (Tozama)
|-
||1||||1591 - 1601||Sama-no-jo (左馬允)|| Junior 5th Rank, Lower Grade (従五位下)||23,000 koku
|-
|colspan=6|  Arima clan, 1601-1620 (Tozama)
|-
||1||||1601 - 1602||Nakatsukasa-no-shoyu (中務少輔)|| Junior 5th Rank, Lower Grade (従五位下)||20,000 koku
|-
|colspan=6|  under Fukuchiyama Domain 1602-1620
|-
|colspan=6|  tenryō　1620 -1626
|-
|colspan=6|  Nomi-Matsudaira clan, 1626-1632 (Fudai)
|-
||1||||1626 - 1632||Tango-no-kami (丹後守)|| Junior 5th Rank, Lower Grade (従五位下)||30,000 koku
|-
|colspan=6|  Kuki clan, 1632 - 1871 (Tozama)
|-
||1||||1632 - 1649||Yamato-no-kami (大和守)|| Junior 5th Rank, Lower Grade (従五位下)||36,000 koku
|-
||2||||1639 - 1669||Nagato-no-kami (長門守)|| Junior 5th Rank, Lower Grade (従五位下)||36,000 koku
|-
||3||||1669 - 1686||Izumi-no-kami (和泉守)|| Junior 5th Rank, Lower Grade (従五位下)||36,000 koku
|-
||4||||1686 - 1697||Nagato-no-kami (長門守)|| Junior 5th Rank, Lower Grade (従五位下)||36,000 koku
|-
||5||||1697 - 1717||Yamato-no-kami (大和守)|| Junior 5th Rank, Lower Grade (従五位下)||36,000 koku
|-
||6||||1717 - 1733||Tango-no-kami (丹後守)|| Junior 5th Rank, Lower Grade (従五位下)||36,000 koku
|-
||7||||1733 - 1743||Ise-no-kami (伊勢守)|| Junior 5th Rank, Lower Grade (従五位下)||36,000 koku
|-
||8||||1743 - 1785||Yamato-no-kami (大和守)|| Junior 5th Rank, Lower Grade (従五位下)||36,000 koku
|-
||9||||1785 - 1798||Nagato-no-kami (長門守)|| Junior 5th Rank, Lower Grade (従五位下)||36,000 koku
|-
||10||||1798 - 1843||Izumi-no-kami (和泉守)|| Junior 5th Rank, Lower Grade (従五位下)||36,000 koku
|-
||11||||1843 - 1854||Nagato-no-kami (長門守)|| Junior 5th Rank, Lower Grade (従五位下)||36,000 koku
|-
||12||||1854 - 1859||Nagato-no-kami (長門守)|| Junior 5th Rank, Lower Grade (従五位下)||36,000 koku
|-
||13||||1859 - 1871||Nagato-no-kami (長門守)|| Junior 5th Rank, Lower Grade (従五位下)||36,000 koku
|-
|}

See also 
 List of Han
 Abolition of the han system

Further reading
 Bolitho, Harold. (1974). Treasures Among Men: The Fudai Daimyo in Tokugawa Japan. New Haven: Yale University Press.  ;  OCLC 185685588

References

Domains of Japan
1591 establishments in Japan
States and territories established in 1591
1871 disestablishments in Japan
States and territories disestablished in 1871
Settsu Province
History of Hyōgo Prefecture